The Scarlet Worm is a 2011 American Revisionist Western film directed by Michael Fredianelli. The film was first released on January 7, 2011 at the Riot Cinema Film Festival. It stars Aaron Stielstra as a young mercenary who is sent to assassinate a cruel brothel owner. Funding for The Scarlet Worm was partially accomplished through a successful Kickstarter campaign.

Plot

Print Harris works as a bounty hunter in early 1900s America. He has a flair for conducting his killings in a theatrical or "poetic" fashion to give his profession more meaning and legitimacy. A wealthy ranch owner Mr. Paul (Brett Halsey) hires Print to eliminate a Dutch immigrant brothel owner Heinrich Kley (Dan Van Husen)who allegedly aborts the unborn children of his prostitutes, as well as to train a young ranch hand named Lee in the art of killing. Print decides to use Lee to infiltrate Kley's business and work for Kley as protection, purposefully luring a posse of cowboys into the brothel in order to murder them, and show off his usefulness. Kley immediately enlists Print to cover a wide variety of duties while entrusting him with his unique philosophy regarding business, religion, and the necessity of prostitution. Matters become complicated when Lee falls in love with one of Kley's prostitutes and informs her of the plan to murder him.

Cast
 Aaron Stielstra as Print
 Dan Van Husen as Heinrich Kley
 Brett Halsey as Mr. Paul
 Kevin Giffin as Hank
 Derek Hertig as Lee
 Eric Zaldivar as Gus
 Rita Rey as Annabelle
 Mike Malloy as Mathis Reed, Love Cowboy
 David Lambert as William Hardtmuth, Cattle Rustler
 Robert Amstler as The Rifleman
 Michael Forest as Judge Hanchett
 Ted Rusoff as Print's Attorney
 Domiziano Arcangeli as Love Cowboy Leader

Release

Home media
The film was released on DVD and Blu-ray on April 24, 2012 by Unearthed.

Reception

Bill Gibron from DVD Talk wrote, "While a bit long-winded in the exposition department and in need of a few dollars more, production-wise, The Scarlet Worm is still an intelligent and entertaining fringe experience." Adrian Halen of HorrorNews.net praised the film's direction, script, and Stielstra's performance, calling it "a shining achievement".

References

External links
 
 
 

2011 films
2011 independent films
2011 Western (genre) films
American Western (genre) films
American independent films
Films about abortion
Films about prostitution in the United States
2010s English-language films
2010s American films